Lawrence Kit Spires (born February 23, 1954) is an American politician. He is a former member of the South Carolina House of Representatives from the 96th District, serving from 2007 to 2020. He is a member of the Republican party.

References

Living people
1954 births
Republican Party members of the South Carolina House of Representatives
21st-century American politicians